Werner Asam (born October 17, 1944, in Mallersdorf, Germany) is a German television actor, director, and writer.

He played several roles in Derrick during the 1980s and 1990s.

Selected filmography

 Derrick - Season 5, Episode 4: "Ein Hinterhalt" (1978)
 Derrick - Season 5, Episode 12: "Ute und Manuela" (1978)
 Derrick - Season 7, Episode 4: "Tödliche Sekunden" (1980)
 Derrick - Season 8, Episode 6: "Tod eines Italieners" (1981)
 Derrick - Season 8, Episode 11: "Die Stunde der Mörder" (1981)
 Derrick - Season 10, Episode 9: "Die Schrecken der Nacht" (1983)
 Derrick - Season 12, Episode 5: "Wer erschoß Asmy?" (1985)
 Trokadero (1981)
 Die Stimme des Mörders (14 April 1989)
 Darf ich Ihnen meinen Mörder vorstellen? (24 June 1994)
 Die zweite Kugel

External links 
 
  

1944 births
Living people
German male film actors
German male television actors
People from Dingolfing-Landau
20th-century German male actors
Television people from Bavaria